In Greek mythology, Sthenelus (Ancient Greek: Σθένελος, Sthenelos, "strong one, forcer"; derived from , "strength, might, force") was a king of Tiryns and Mycenae, and the son of Perseus who founded the latter city.

Family 
Sthenelus' mother was Andromeda, an Ethiopian princess as daughter of King Cepheus and Queen Cassiopeia. He was the brother of Perses, Alcaeus, Heleus, Mestor, Electryon, Cynurus, Gorgophone and Autochthoe. By Nicippe, sister of Atreus and Thyestes, Sthenelus became the father of Eurystheus, Alcyone and Medusa (Astymedusa).

Mythology 
Sthenelus exiled his nephew Amphitryon, born to his brother Alcaeus, from Mycenae for having murdered Electryon, Sthenelus' other brother. (Amphitryon was also the husband of his niece, Alcmene, and she joined him in his exile.) As heir, Sthenelus was the successor to the throne of Mycenae. He was in turn succeeded by his son Eurystheus, born to him and his wife Nicippe, and eventually killed by Hyllus, son of Heracles and Deianira.

Notes

References
 Apollodorus, The Library with an English Translation by Sir James George Frazer, F.B.A., F.R.S. in 2 Volumes, Cambridge, MA, Harvard University Press; London, William Heinemann Ltd. 1921. . Online version at the Perseus Digital Library. Greek text available from the same website.
Gaius Julius Hyginus, Fabulae from The Myths of Hyginus translated and edited by Mary Grant. University of Kansas Publications in Humanistic Studies. Online version at the Topos Text Project.

Perseid dynasty
Kings of Mycenae
Kings of Tiryns

Kings in Greek mythology
Mythology of Argolis